Florence Oberle (December 6, 1869 – July 10, 1943) was a stage and film actress from Tarrytown, New York.

Career
Born in 1869, Oberle appeared in Morosco Theatre and David Belasco productions. She was once billed as "the most beautiful woman on the American stage."  In California Oberle played opposite theatrical stars like Edward Everett Horton and Trixie Friganza. Her last appearance on stage came in 1931, performing with Jane Cowl in Camille.

In 1915 Oberle signed with Essanay Studios, a pioneer film studio of the silent movie era. She also performed with Charles Ray and various Hollywood actors at Keystone Studios, Triangle Studios, and Famous Players. Among her films are The White Sister (1915), When My Lady Smiles (1915), Separating From Sarah (1916), The Invisible Web (1917), Her Country First (1918), and Smudge (1922).

Personal life and death 
Oberle lived in Chicago, Illinois, for three years. When she retired she came to reside in Los Angeles, California, in 1931. Her home was at 1237 West 96th Street.

She was married to actor Thomas Oberle, and they had a son, Jack. Oberle died at the Little Romano Sanitarium in North Glendale, California, on July 11, 1943. She was 73 years old.

References

External links

American stage actresses
American film actresses
American silent film actresses
People from Tarrytown, New York
1869 births
1943 deaths
Actresses from New York (state)
20th-century American actresses